The President Ho Chi Minh Mausoleum is a mausoleum which serves as the resting place of Vietnamese revolutionary leader and President Ho Chi Minh in Hanoi, Vietnam. It is a large building located in the center of Ba Dinh Square, where Ho, Chairman of the Workers' Party of Vietnam from 1951 until his death in 1969, read the Declaration of Independence on 2 September 1945, establishing the Democratic Republic of Vietnam. It is open to the public every morning except Monday.

Building 

Construction work began on September 2, 1973, and the mausoleum was formally inaugurated on August 29, 1975. It was inspired by Lenin's Mausoleum in Moscow but incorporates distinct Vietnamese architectural elements, such as the sloping roof. The exterior is made of grey granite, while the interior is grey, black and red polished stone. The mausoleum's portico has the words "Chủ tịch Hồ-Chí-Minh" (President Ho Chi Minh) inscribed across it. The banner beside says "Nước Cộng Hòa Xã Hội Chủ Nghĩa Việt Nam Muôn Năm" (en: "Long live The Socialist Republic of Vietnam").

Flanking the mausoleum are two platforms with seven steps for parade viewing. The plaza in front of the mausoleum is divided into 240 green squares separated by pathways. The gardens surrounding the mausoleum have nearly 250 different species of plants and flowers, all from different regions of Vietnam. Also during parades, the tribune is used as a viewing stage for leaders to watch from similar to the tribune of Lenin's Tomb.

The embalmed body of President Ho Chi Minh is preserved in the cooler, central hall of the mausoleum, which is protected by a military honour guard. The body lies in a glass case with dim lights. The mausoleum is generally open to the public.

See also 

 Ho Chi Minh Museum, which is located next to the mausoleum
 Mai Dịch Cemetery

References

External links 

Buildings and structures in Hanoi
Historical sites in Hanoi
Ho Chi Minh
Mausoleums in Vietnam
Tourist attractions in Hanoi
1975 establishments in Vietnam